Giuseppe De Vittorio, commonly known as Pino De Vittorio (born 24 December 1954) is an Italian tenor and actor. He has also sung as a sopranist.

In 1976 with Angelo Savelli he founded La Compagnia Pupi e Fresedde which performed Apulian folk music and tarantellas.

Discography
 Tarantelle del Gargano L'Empreinte Digitale 1997
 Tarantelle del Rimorso Eloquentia 2006
 Cantate Napoletane del '700 La Cappella della Pietà de' Turchini directed Antonio Florio. Eloquentia 2009
 Siciliano Glossa Records 2013

References

Living people
1954 births